The David Cole House is a house located in Portland, Oregon, listed on the National Register of Historic Places.  The house includes several stained glass windows made by Portland's Povey Brothers Studio. It is in the Kenton neighborhood of North Portland, and operates as an events venues called the Victorian Belle.

See also
 National Register of Historic Places listings in North Portland, Oregon

References

External links
 

1890 establishments in Oregon
Houses completed in 1890
Houses on the National Register of Historic Places in Portland, Oregon
Queen Anne architecture in Oregon
Kenton, Portland, Oregon
Portland Historic Landmarks